MVPA may refer to:

 Military Vehicle Preservation Association
 Multivoxel pattern analysis, a statistical technique used in the analysis of fMRI images
 Moderate to Vigorous Physical Activity, a standard measure of physical activity

 Muvattupuzha, a major town in Kerala, India.